Tom Clancy's SSN is a submarine simulator of the 688i (Improved Los Angeles-class nuclear hunter/killer submarine). Gameplay is limited to a 15 mission single-player campaign in which the player carries out anti-submarine, anti-surface ship roles, intelligence gathering activities, and the launch of submarine based cruise missiles. Tom Clancy also wrote a book by the same name as a tie-in.

SSN is also the title of a board wargame published by Game Designer's Workshop in 1975, and was the first attempt at a serious modern submarine and anti-submarine warfare simulation game published for the entertainment market. It was designed by Stephen Newberg and developed by Marc Miller.

Gameplay
The computer game version uses video briefings and fictional news reports to enhance the atmosphere both before and after the missions. The view during gameplay is from the perspective of an external trailing rotatable camera. In game player weapons are limited to submarine-launched torpedoes, with a VLS system for launching Tomahawk missiles at off-map targets (as a mission objective). The player is provided with a simplified scanning screen display for sonar. Thermoclines at various depths are simulated as well, affecting sonar readings and accuracy. Commands are limited to directional steering, ballast tank and periscope controls, basic sonar functions, and weapons targeting and firing, providing an arcade like feel to the game play, as opposed to a true submarine command simulation.

Development
Tom Clancy SSN was a joint venture of Simon & Schuster Interactive, Virtus Corp., and Clancy Interactive Entertainment, a company Clancy formed to translate his concepts into multimedia products.

References

External links

1996 video games
Submarine simulation video games
Tom Clancy games
Video games developed in the United States
Windows games
Windows-only games
Simon & Schuster Interactive games
Single-player video games